Allan Stanley Young (7 July 1920 – 23 December 1974) was an Australian cricketer. He was a right-handed batsman and leg-break, googly bowler. He played 23 first-class cricket matches for Queensland between 1945 and 1950, scoring 553 runs and taking 26 wickets.

References

External links
 

1920 births
Australian cricketers
Queensland cricketers
Sportsmen from Queensland
1974 deaths
20th-century Australian people